"Sentimental Education" is the 58th episode of the HBO original series The Sopranos and the sixth of the show's fifth season. Written by Matthew Weiner and directed by Peter Bogdanovich, it originally aired on April 11, 2004.

Starring
 James Gandolfini as Tony Soprano
 Lorraine Bracco as Jennifer Melfi *
 Edie Falco as Carmela Soprano
 Michael Imperioli as Christopher Moltisanti
 Dominic Chianese as Corrado Soprano, Jr. *
 Steven Van Zandt as Silvio Dante
 Tony Sirico as Paulie Gualtieri
 Robert Iler as Anthony Soprano, Jr. 
 Jamie-Lynn DiScala as Meadow Soprano
 Drea de Matteo as Adriana La Cerva
 Aida Turturro as Janice Soprano Baccalieri
 Steven R. Schirripa as Bobby Baccalieri
 Steve Buscemi as Tony Blundetto

* = credit only

Guest starring

Synopsis
Tony is finding it increasingly difficult to take care of A.J., who is sent back to Carmela. She lets him move back in on the condition that he improve his grades and behavior. Carmela goes to see Mr. Wegler at the school and agrees to have dinner with him the following evening. After dinner, they go to his home and have sex. Carmela meets Father Phil Intintola; he reminds her that she made a commitment to her husband before God. However, she continues the affair, even after making formal confession.

One evening with Wegler she abruptly leaves, saying she is upset about A.J.’s academic performance, and also troubled by the laws of the Church. The next day, Wegler pressures  A.J.'s English teacher to raise his grade for a poorly written term paper. After several rounds of sex after which Carmela talks each time about A.J., Wegler concludes that she is just using him to get her son better grades, and tells her he wants to end the relationship. Carmela is deeply hurt and, after an argument, storms out. When her father suggests that she look for other men, Carmela replies that, as Tony's wife, her motives will always be distrusted.

Tony B tries to adjust to civilian life. Kim, his Korean-American employer, who was pressured by Tony Soprano into giving him a job, is hostile. But he changes his mind when he realizes how hard Tony B is working, both on the job and in his efforts to pass the state massage board exam. Kim offers to partner up with him, since he has an empty storefront in West Caldwell. Tony B passes the exam and begins work on the storefront, preparing it for business. But then he comes across a bag containing $12,000, thrown away by fleeing drug dealers, and goes on a self-destructive tear, wasting most of the money on gambling and expensive clothes. Kim visits the store and encourages him to keep on working. Tony B, sleepless, and under physical and emotional pressure, snaps, and beats him up. With Tony at Nuovo Vesuvio, Tony B hints that he screwed up and asks if he still needs someone to cover the airbag scheme.

Title reference
 Sentimental Education is a novel by Gustave Flaubert, who also wrote Madame Bovary, which Mr. Wegler recommends to Carmela.

Production
 The episode was directed by Peter Bogdanovich, who also has a recurring guest role as Elliot Kupferberg (Melfi's psychotherapist) on the show, although he does not appear in this episode.
 Although the sixth episode of the season, it was produced seventh, due to the scheduling availability of director Peter Bogdanovich, as the following episode was directed by cast member Steve Buscemi, who wanted to direct an episode in which his character was minimally featured.

Cultural references
 Carmela finds the book The Letters of Abelard and Heloise in Wegler's bathroom and asks him about it. She later tells Father Phil who erroneously corrects her pronunciation of 'Heloise'.
 During her confession, Carmela tells Father Phil Intintola that her affair makes her feel like "walking around on a cloud" as the character Maria from the West Side Story.
 Tony Blundetto refers to "piping in a little Keith Jarrett" when discussing his plan for a massage studio.
 Tony Blundetto buys his twin sons a pair of Nintendo Game Boy Advance handheld game consoles.
 A.J. tries to write an English school paper on Animal Farm but ends up plagiarizing it. He later tries to write a paper on Lord of the Flies, which he also plagiarizes.
 When Wegler tells A.J.'s English teacher, Mr. Fiske, to raise the grade of his term paper that was "90 percent CliffsNotes," Fiske refers to A.J. as "Fredo Corleone," a character from The Godfather novel and films, alluding to the fact that he is part of a powerful family despite being an unintelligent member.
 After Tony Blundetto tells Paulie and the others at Satriale's Pork Store about his business opportunity with Kim, Paulie comments "Word to the wise, remember Pearl Harbor!", ignorant to the fact that Kim is actually Korean.

Music 
 The song played on Tony B's delivery truck radio when it's stolen is "The Breakup Song (They Don't Write 'Em)" by The Greg Kihn Band.
 The song played when Carmela is deciding what to wear before seeing Robert Wegler is "The Angels Listened In" by The Crests.
 The song played when Carmela and Bob eat at a restaurant is "Mon homme" (lyrics by Maurice Yvain).
 The song played when Carmela is peeling the cucumber is "Over The Mountain" by Johnnie & Joe.
 The song played in Paulie's Cadillac is "Hold Me, Thrill Me, Kiss Me" by Mel Carter.
 The song played over the end credits is "The Blues is my Business" by  Etta James.
 Tony Blundetto's ringtone is a monophonic version of "We Are The Champions" by Queen
 The song played in the restaurant at the end is a version of Modern Jazz Quartet's "Django."

References

External links
"Sentimental Education"  at HBO

The Sopranos (season 5) episodes
2004 American television episodes